George H. Baldwin (January 13, 1923 – July 4, 2013) was an American football player and coach. He served as the head football coach at Kutztown University of Pennsylvania from 1973 to 1983 and again from 1985 to 1987, compiling a record of 61–71–3. Baldwin played college football at Bowling Green State University in Bowling Green, Ohio. In between his two stints at Kutztown, he spent the 1984 season as an offensive assistant for the New England Patriots of the National Football League (NFL).

References

1923 births
2013 deaths
American football guards
Bowling Green Falcons football players
High school football coaches in New Jersey
Kutztown Golden Bears football coaches
New England Patriots coaches
sportspeople from Chester County, Pennsylvania